Succingulodes is a genus of tachinid flies in the family Tachinidae.

Species
Succingulodes elodioides Townsend, 1935

Distribution
Guyana.

References

Exoristinae
Diptera of South America
Tachinidae genera
Taxa named by Charles Henry Tyler Townsend
Monotypic Brachycera genera